The A58 motorway is a motorway in the Netherlands. The A58 is located in the Dutch provinces of North Brabant and Zeeland.

The A58 connects North Brabant's three major cities Eindhoven, Tilburg and Breda with the cities Goes, Middelburg and Vlissingen in Zeeland.

History
With the reconstruction works of the Randweg Eindhoven, the beltway of the city, nearing completion, the A58 motorway has been shortened by a few kilometers. The road now only starts at the interchange Batadorp. The section between its former eastern terminus (interchange Ekkersrijt/John F. Kennedylaan) and the interchange Ekkersweijer has now become part of the A50, while the section between interchanges Ekkersweijer and Batadorp is now only a part of the A2, and is no longer shared with the A58.

Traffic jams
The motorway 58 is congested everyday, especially between Oirschot - Tilburg and between Roosendaal - Bergen Op Zoom.

It had a counterproductive effect: more traffic jams occurred in January–March 2011.

In 2011, the BZW (Brabant-Zealandic Employers association) got involved with the widening of the roads, while companies located near the motorway complain about the national government's "neglecting and pointing too much to the Randstad". The target is to widen the motorway in Brabant everywhere to at least 2x3 lanes, around Tilburg to 4x2 (with local- express-)lanes and relocate the section through Roosendaal.

Route description

Speed limit

Western terminus near Vlissingen

The A58 motorway section ends just east of the city of Vlissingen. From the intersection where the motorway ends, drivers can go straight ahead towards the N288 road, which brings them to the centre of the city or to a number of towns further to the west on the island.

European routes

Between interchange Batadorp, the future start of the A58, and the western end of the motorway near Vlissingen, the European route E312 follows the road. The shared section of the A58 and the A16 is also part of the European route E19.

Exit list

References

External links

Motorways in the Netherlands
Motorways in North Brabant
Motorways in Zeeland
Transport in Bergen op Zoom
Transport in Breda
Transport in Eindhoven
Transport in Goes
Transport in Middelburg, Zeeland
Transport in Reimerswaal
Transport in Roosendaal
Transport in Tilburg
Transport in Vlissingen